Michel Currat (born 1 December 1933) is a Swiss former freestyle swimmer. He competed in the men's 100 metre freestyle at the 1952 Summer Olympics.

References

External links
 

1933 births
Living people
Olympic swimmers of Switzerland
Swimmers at the 1952 Summer Olympics
Place of birth missing (living people)
Swiss male freestyle swimmers